Plectroglyphidodon randalli is a species of Perciformes in the family Pomacentridae.

References 

randalli
Animals described in 1991